Guttahalli is a small village in the Kolar Taluk of Kolar district in Karnataka, India. It is situated about 15 kilometers from Kolar.

Demographics 
According to the 2011 Indian Census, the village consists of 630 people. The town has a literacy rate of 58.57 percent which is higher than Karnataka's average of 75.36 percent.

References

Villages in Kolar district